Charles Mark Correa (1 September 1930 – 16 June 2015) was an Indian architect and urban planner. Credited with the creation of modern architecture in post-Independent India, he was celebrated for his sensitivity to the needs of the urban poor and for his use of traditional methods and materials.

Biography

Early life
Charles Correa, a Roman Catholic of Goan descent, was born on 1 September 1930 in Secunderabad. He began his higher studies at St. Xavier's College, Mumbai. He went on to study at the University of Michigan (1949–53) where Buckminster Fuller was a teacher, and the Massachusetts Institute of Technology (1953–55) where he obtained his master's degree.

Career
In 1958, Charles Correa established his own professional practice in Mumbai. His first significant project was the Mahatma Gandhi Sangrahalaya (Mahatma Gandhi Memorial) at Sabarmati Ashram in Ahmedabad (1958–1963), followed by the Madhya Pradesh Legislative Assembly in Bhopal (1967). In 1961-1966, he designed his first high-rise building, the Sonmarg apartments in Mumbai. On the National Crafts Museum in New Delhi (1975–1990), he introduced "the rooms open to the sky", his systematic use of courtyards. In the Jawahar Kala Kendra (Jawahar Arts Centre) in Jaipur (1986–1992), he makes a structural hommage to Jai Singh II. Later, he invited the British artist Howard Hodgkin for the outside design of the British Council in Delhi (1987–1992).

From 1970–75, Charles Correa was Chief Architect for New Bombay (Navi Mumbai), where he was strongly involved in extensive urban planning of the new city. In 1984, Charles Correa founded the Urban Design Research Institute in Bombay, dedicated to the protection of the built environment and improvement of urban communities. During the final four decades of his life, Correa has done pioneering work in urban issues and low-cost shelter in the Third World. In 1985, Prime Minister Rajiv Gandhi appointed him Chairman of the National Commission on Urbanization.

From 2005 until his 2008 resignation Correa was the Chairman of the Delhi Urban Arts Commission.

Later, Charles Correa designed the new Ismaili Centre in Toronto, Canada, which shared the site with the Aga Khan Museum designed by Fumihiko Maki, and the Champalimaud Foundation Centre in Lisbon, inaugurated by the Portuguese President Aníbal Cavaco Silva on 5 October 2010.

Final years
He died on 16 June 2015 in Mumbai following a brief illness.

Work

Style
Charles Correa designed almost 100 buildings in India, from low-income housing to luxury condos. He rejected the glass-and-steel approach of some post-modernist buildings, and focused on designs deeply rooted in local cultures, all the while providing modern structural solutions under his creative designs. His style was also focused on reintroducing outdoor spaces and terraces.

In 2013, the Royal Institute of British Architects held a retrospective exhibition, "Charles Correa – India's Greatest Architect", about the influences of his work on modern urban Indian architecture.

Projects

Awards
1972: Padma Shri
1984: Royal Gold Medal for architecture by the Royal Institute of British Architects.
1994: Praemium Imperiale
1998: 7th Aga Khan Award for Architecture for Madhya Pradesh Legislative Assembly
2005: Austrian Decoration for Science and Art
2006: Padma Vibhushan given by Government of India
2011: Gomant Vibhushan conferred by Government of Goa

Publications
Charles Correa, The New Landscape, RIBA Enterprises, December 1985,

Personal life
Charles Correa married Monika (née Sequeira), an artist, in 1961. Together they lived in one of the flats of the Sonmarg apartments in Mumbai. They had two children.

See also
 Geoffrey Bawa
 Muzharul Islam
 B.V. Doshi
 Raj Rewal
 Bashirul Haq

References

Further reading
 Post Colonial India and its Architecture – I: Charles Correa – The Traditional in the Modern

External links

 Charles Correa – Photo Gallery at BBC Radio 3
 Charles Mark Correa Biography
 Charles Correa Associates
 Charles Correa Foundation

1930 births
2015 deaths
Goan Catholics
St. Xavier's College, Mumbai alumni
Taubman College of Architecture and Urban Planning alumni
Massachusetts Institute of Technology alumni
Postmodern architecture in India
Urban designers
Indian urban planners
Recipients of the Padma Shri in science & engineering
Recipients of the Padma Vibhushan in science & engineering
Recipients of the Royal Gold Medal
Recipients of the Praemium Imperiale
Recipients of the Austrian Decoration for Science and Art
20th-century Indian architects
People from Secunderabad
Indian environmentalists
Activists from Andhra Pradesh
20th-century Indian educational theorists
Founders of Indian schools and colleges
21st-century Indian architects
21st-century Indian educational theorists
Indian architects